Blizhnyaya Igumenka is a rural locality (a selo) and the administrative center of Belovskoye Rural Settlement, Belgorodsky District, Belgorod Oblast, Russia. The population was 1,063 as of 2010. There are 90 streets.

Geography 
Blizhnyaya Igumenka is located 27 km northeast of Maysky (the district's administrative centre) by road. Belovskoye is the nearest rural locality.

References 

Rural localities in Belgorodsky District
Belgorodsky Uyezd